Sion Record Bostick (7 December 1819 – 15 October 1902) was a soldier for the Texas Army during the Texas Revolution, and later fought for the Confederate States Army during the American Civil War. Bostick is most famous as one of the Texas Army scouts who captured Antonio López de Santa Anna during the Texas Revolution.

Early life
Bostick was born in Montgomery, Alabama on 7 December 1819. His father, Levi Bostick, was granted land by Stephen F. Austin in what was to become Matagorda County, Texas. Levi moved to Texas on 24 July 1824, and his family followed in 1828.

In 1829, the Bostick family moved to San Felipe. They again moved in 1832, this time to Colorado County near the present town of Columbus, Texas.

Texas revolution

Sion Bostick enlisted in the Texas Army at the age of 15. In 1835, he took part in the Battle of Gonzales, and later that year he fought at the Siege of Béxar.

When Mexican General Antonio López de Santa Anna marched into Texas in 1836, Bostick reenlisted as a private in Col. Edward Burleson's First Regiment of Texas Volunteers. On 21 April 1836, he fought in the Battle of San Jacinto.

The day after the Battle of San Jacinto, Captain Moseley Baker ordered Bostick and two other soldiers (Washington H. Secrest and James A. Sylvester) to scout around the prairie in search of escaping Mexican soldiers. They spotted and captured a Mexican soldier hiding in tall grass. Upon returning to camp, they discovered that their prisoner was the Mexican President and General Antonio López de Santa Anna. Bostick noted in his memoirs that:

When we got to camp, the Mexican soldiers, then prisoners, saluted him and said, "el presidente." We knew then that we had made a big haul.

Sion later accounted his story for the Texas historical association in 1901;

Sion Bostick can be seen in the painting Surrender of Santa Anna by William Henry Huddle, which depicts Santa Anna surrendering to a wounded Sam Houston. The painting is on display in the Texas State Capitol in Austin.

Mexican American War and the Civil War
Bostick was living in Colorado County in 1840, and he fought in the Battle of Plum Creek. He claimed to have served in the Mexican–American War in Company E of Col. John Coffee Hays's First Texas Mounted Rifles. Although the Company was recruited in Columbus County, Bostick's name does not appear on the Company's muster roll.

On 21 March 1862, Bostick enlisted in the Fifth Texas Infantry regiment of the famed Hood's Texas Brigade at the age of 42. He served in Virginia and fought in the Battle of Antietam. Five days after the battle at Antietam, Bostick was discharged by the secretary of war because he was deemed too old to fight.

Personal life and later years
Sion Bostick married Susan Townsend (22 November 1823 - 27 February 1860) on 4 April 1839. They had seven children. The couple divorced in 1856. Bostick later married Mary Indiana Rhodes (1841–1917) on 3 October 1858.

In 1864 Bostick was charged with attacking a slave named Joseph with a 'sharp stick'. The charges were eventually dropped.

Bostick spent his later years at his home in San Saba, Texas. He was a member of the Texas Veteran's Association. At the age of 80, he dictated his memoirs of the Texas Revolution, which were published in 1901 in the Southwestern Historical Quarterly. Sion Bostick died of cancer in San Saba on 15 October 1902.

Texas Historical Marker
In 1973, a Historical Marker was erected in honor of Sion Bostick in San Saba, Texas near his grave site. The text of the marker reads:

Sion Record Bostick. (December 7, 1819-October 15, 1902) A member of the party of young Texans who captured the escaping Mexican General Santa Anna after Battle of San Jacinto, during the Texas War for Independence. Migrated from Alabama in 1828. Served in Texas army at Gonzales and Bexar (San Antonio), 1835; at San Jacinto, 1836; and 1840 stand against Comanches, at Plum Creek. An American soldier in Mexican War, 1846; a Confederate in Hood's Brigade in the Civil War, 1860s. Married Susan Townsend; after her death, Mary Indiana Rhodes. Had several children. Became a leader in veterans reunions. He is buried in San Saba Cemetery.

References

External links
 Biography of Sion Record Bostick from The Handbook of Texas Online
 Reminisences of Sion R Bostick at Southwestern Historical Quarterly Online
 Dwitt Colony Biographies at Texas A&M University
 City of Columbus Texas History
 Sion Record Bostick Historic Marker at Waymarking.com

1819 births
1902 deaths
Military personnel from Montgomery, Alabama
People of the Texas Revolution
American military personnel of the Mexican–American War
Confederate States Army soldiers
United States Army soldiers
People from Columbus, Texas